The Czech Institute of Informatics, Robotics and Cybernetics (Český institut informatiky, robotiky a kybernetiky, CIIRC) was established as a part of CTU on July 1, 2013. Its mission is to become an internationally respected research institute, which participates in education of students and is a place responsible for a technology transfer into the field of industry. In the premises of the CTU in Dejvice there has been two new buildings for CIIRC built since November 2013. The construction works should be finished and the buildings prepared for its inhabitants - employees of CIIRC at the end of summer 2016. CIIRC will reside in a new building, which used to serve as a Technical University canteen and one of the biggest Billa hypermarkets.

CIIRC consists of eight research departments,  CYPHY: Cyber-physical systems, INTSYS: Intelligent systems, IIG: Industrial informatics, RMP: Robotics and machine perception, IPA: Industrial production and automation, COGSYS: Cognitive systems and neurosciences, BEAT: Biomedical engineering and Assistive technologies, PLAT: Research Management of Platforms. Research departments are further divided into groups. The head of CIIRC is Ondřej Velek.

References

External links
 Website

Information science
Robotics organizations
Cybernetics
Education in Czechoslovakia